Jean Dewey Brundage (born October 1, 1931 –  July 7, 2022) was an American former professional football player from Alhambra, California.

Background

Early life
Brundage was born as the youngest of four children to Frank and Georgia Brundage on October 1, 1931.

Career
Brundage played for Brigham Young University as an end for the Brigham Young Cougars. He was nominated in 1953 for the Associated Press all-America football team.  He was a defensive end (#83) for the Pittsburgh Steelers of the NFL for one season in 1954, before being inducted into the US Army in early 1955. He acted as coach for the Manti High School Templars from 1980-1981 with a season score of 3 wins and 15 losses.

Personal life
He is married to Katherine Brundage and has four children.

Death
He passed away on July 7, 2022 in Orem, Utah.

References

External links
 Dewey Brundage at NFL.com

1931 births
2022 deaths
Sportspeople from Alhambra, California
Players of American football from California
BYU Cougars football players
Pittsburgh Steelers players
American football defensive ends